Yeliz Gunes (born 28 February 2006) is a Turkish rhythmic gymnast, member of the national group.

Career 
Yeliz debuted at the 1st Junior World Championships in Moscow where she competed with ball, finishing 26th.

After becoming a senior in 2022 Gunes entered the national group and competed at the 2021 Islamic Solidarity Games in Konya where the group won bronze with 3 ribbons and 2 balls. In September Yeliz took part in the World Championships in Sofia along Işıl Alaş, Nehir Serap Ozdemir, Melisa Sert, Duru Duygu Usta, and the individual Kamelya Tuncel, taking 21st place in the All-Around, 17th with 5 hoops and 27th with 3 ribbons + 2 balls.

References 

2006 births
Turkish rhythmic gymnasts
Living people
People from Almaty
21st-century Turkish sportswomen